This list of museums in Prince Edward Island contains museums which are defined for this context as institutions (including nonprofit organizations, government entities, and private businesses) that collect and care for objects of cultural, artistic, scientific, or historical interest and make their collections or related exhibits available for public viewing. Also included are non-profit art galleries and university art galleries.  Museums that exist only in cyberspace (i.e., virtual museums) are not included.

Defunct museums
 Founders Hall, Charlottetown, closed in 2016
 Great Island Science & Adventure Park, Cavendish, closed in 2009, website

See also
Nature centres in Prince Edward Island

References

External links
 Prince Edward Island Museum Association

Prince Edward Island
 
Museums